Murgisca is a genus of snout moths. It was described by Francis Walker in 1863.

Species
 Murgisca cervinalis Walker, 1863
 Murgisca diplommatalis Dyar, 1914
 Murgisca pyrophoralis
 Murgisca subductellus (Möschler, 1890)

References

External links
 

Chrysauginae